Myrtle Springs may refer to:
Myrtle Springs, Texas, a census-designated place (CDP) in Van Zandt County, Texas
Myrtle Springs, Anderson County, Texas, an unincorporated community
Myrtle Springs Station, a sheep ranch in South Australia